Samuel Delbert Clark  (1910–2003), known as S. D. Clark or Del Clark, was a Canadian sociologist.

Born on 24 February 1910 in Lloydminster, Alberta, Clark grew up near Streamstown, Alberta. He received a Bachelor of Arts degree in political science and history in 1930 and a Master of Arts degree in 1931 from the University of Saskatchewan. His master's thesis was titled Settlement in Saskatchewan with Special Reference to Dry Farming. From 1932 to 1933, he studied at the London School of Economics. In 1935, he received a Master of Arts degree from McGill University and a Doctor of Philosophy degree in 1938 from the University of Toronto. His 1937 doctoral thesis was titled The Canadian Manufacturers' Association: A Political and Social Study. In 1943, he was awarded a fellowship from the John Simon Guggenheim Memorial Foundation.

In 1938, he started teaching at the University of Toronto in the department of political economy. Through his efforts, sociology gained respect from Canadian scholars who were initially skeptical of the discipline. On 1 July 1963, he led the founding of the sociology department and served as its first chair until 1969. He retired in 1976, but taught for years as a visiting professor at a number of places, including Dalhousie University, Lakehead University, and the University of Edinburgh.

As a sociologist, Clark became known for studies interpreting Canadian social development as a process of disorganization and re-organization on a series of economic frontiers. His scholarship won him acceptance at a time when Canadian academics were still skeptical of the new discipline of sociology. Under Clark's direction, a series on the Social Credit movement produced 10 monographs by Canadian scholars. In the 1960s, Clark's interest shifted to contemporary consequences of economic changes, especially suburban living and urban poverty.

Clark's publications – mainly books – include The Canadian Manufacturers Association (1939), The Social Development of Canada (1942), Church and Sect in Canada (1948), Movements of Political Protest in Canada (1959), The Developing Canadian Community (1962), The Suburban Society (1966), Canadian Society in Historical Perspective (1976), and The New Urban Poor (1978).

Clark was elected president of the Canadian Political Science Association in 1958 and honorary president of the Canadian Sociology and Anthropology Association in 1967. In 1978, he was made an Officer of the Order of Canada as "social historian of international repute and, as one of our most distinguished scholars". A fellow of the Royal Society of Canada, he also served as its president from 1975 to 1976. He was elected a foreign honorary member of the American Academy of Arts and Sciences in 1976. He was awarded the J. B. Tyrrell Historical Medal in 1960. He received honorary degrees from the University of Calgary, Dalhousie University, Lakehead University, the University of Western Ontario, the University of Manitoba, and the University of Toronto.

In 1999, the Department of Sociology, University of Toronto instituted the endowed "S.D. Clark Chair" in his honour. The first holder of the chair was William Michelson, a scholar of housing and urban sociology. In 2006, he was succeeded by Barry Wellman, a scholar of the Internet, community, and social networks.

Clark was married to Rosemary Landry Clark for 63 years, until her death in February 2008. His children are Samuel Clark, a sociologist at the University of Western Ontario; W. Edmund Clark, CEO of the Toronto-Dominion Bank; and Ellen Tabisz, a social worker and adjunct professor at the University of Manitoba. Clark died on 18 September 2003.

Selected bibliography 
 The Canadian Manufacturers Association (1939)
 The Social Development of Canada (1942)
 Church and Sect in Canada (1948)
 Movements of Political Protest in Canada (1959)
 The Developing Canadian Community (1962)
 The Suburban Society (1966)
 Canadian Society in Historical Perspective (1976)
 The New Urban Poor (1978)

See also 

 Human ecology

References

Footnotes

Works cited

External links 

 Samuel Delbert Clark archival papers held at the University of Toronto Archives and Records Management Services

1910 births
2003 deaths
Alumni of the London School of Economics
Canadian sociologists
Fellows of the Royal Society of Canada
McGill University alumni
Officers of the Order of Canada
People from Lloydminster
Scientists from Alberta
Scientists from Ontario
University of Saskatchewan alumni
University of Toronto alumni
Academic staff of the University of Toronto
Writers from Alberta
Presidents of the Canadian Political Science Association
20th-century political scientists